The Harrodian School is a private day school in Barnes, South-west London. Formerly the site of Harrods Sports Club, the original premises have been extended and converted for educational purposes. The school opened in September 1993 with 65 pupils; by 2011, the roll had grown to 925.

History
The Harrodian school was founded by Lady Eliana and Sir Alford Houstoun-Boswall with 65 pupils and 12 staff.

Until 1988, the site had been a clubhouse and sports ground for employees of Harrods department store, and known as the Harrodian Club. While the store's owner Mohamed Al-Fayed sold the grounds, he was not happy that the school took the name, and in fact, challenged this in court.

Eliana Houstoun-Boswall was the founding headmistress, but in 1996 was left by her husband after her affair with a teacher became public. The publicity again prompted Harrods to object to the school's perceived connection to them. She has gone on to found another private school, Hampton Court House.

By September 2010, the school had grown to 1500 pupils and 120 members of staff.

In 2011, long-serving principal Peter Thompson died.

Fees and charges
As of 2021, the school charges tuition fees of (term/year): £5,463/£16,389 (4.5–7 years of age); £6,268/£18,804 (8–12 years); £7,245/£21,735 (13–15 years) and £8,391/£25,173 (sixth form). In addition to tuition fees, charges are made for lunch; insurance, and registration; these additional charges amount to approximately £1,500/year.

Notable former pupils

 Robert Pattinson, actor
 Tom Sturridge, actor 
 George MacKay, actor
 Will Poulter, actor
 Will Heard, musician
 Jack and Finn Harries, Youtubers
 Abigail Lawrie, actress
 Isabel Getty, singer and socialite

References

External links
 Official school website
 Ofsted page
  Achievement and attainment tables 2008 at the DCSF
 League Table entry at the BBC
 Directory entry

1993 establishments in England
Educational institutions established in 1993
Harrods
Private co-educational schools in London
Private schools in the London Borough of Richmond upon Thames